Joseph Brankin Frisby (26 February 1908 – 2 November 1977) was an English cricketer active in 1938 who played for Leicestershire. He was born in Carlton Curlieu and died in Leicester. He appeared in one first-class match as a righthanded batsman who kept wicket. He scored four runs and took three catches.

He was educated at Harrow School.

Notes

1908 births
1977 deaths
English cricketers
Leicestershire cricketers
People educated at Harrow School
People from Harborough District
Cricketers from Leicestershire